James Hunter Renfrow (born December 21, 1995) is an American football wide receiver for the Las Vegas Raiders of the National Football League (NFL). He played college football at Clemson and was drafted by the Raiders in the fifth round of the 2019 NFL Draft.

High school career
Renfrow attended Socastee High School in Myrtle Beach, South Carolina, where his father, Tim, was the football coach. He played quarterback for Socastee's football team and was rated by Rivals.com as a two-star recruit. He received offers from Appalachian State, Gardner-Webb, Presbyterian, and Wofford, where his father played.

College career
Despite receiving scholarship offers to play football and baseball at schools in the Football Championship Subdivision (FCS), Renfrow enrolled at Clemson University, and walked on to the Clemson Tigers football team. He took a redshirt in 2014. Renfrow played in all 13 games as a redshirt freshman in 2015, making ten starts, and recording 492 yards and five touchdowns. He caught two touchdown passes in the 2016 College Football Playoff National Championship. In 2016, Renfrow played in just nine games as a sophomore due to injury. He recorded 353 yards and caught four touchdown passes. In the 2017 College Football Playoff National Championship against the Alabama Crimson Tide, he caught the game-winning touchdown 
from quarterback Deshaun Watson with one second remaining in the game.

In 2018, Renfrow won the Burlsworth Trophy, given to the best college player who began his career as a walk-on. In his final collegiate season in 2018, his receiving total declined slightly, as he recorded 49 receptions for 544 receiving yards and one receiving touchdown. However, he did help Clemson win its second national championship in three years.

Professional career

Renfrow was drafted by the Oakland Raiders with the 149th overall pick in the fifth round of the 2019 NFL Draft, the 17th of 28 wide receivers, one of three Clemson players taken by the Raiders, and the only offensive player drafted from the National Championship team.

2019

Renfrow was listed as a starting wide receiver on the Raiders' depth chart since the first release. Renfrow made his NFL debut in Week 1 against the Denver Broncos on Monday Night Football, with two catches for 13 yards in the 24–16 win. In Week 8 against the Houston Texans, Renfrow caught four passes for 88 yards including a 65-yard touchdown reception, the first of his career in the 27–24 loss. In Week 12 against the New York Jets, Renfrow caught three passes for 31 yards before exiting the game due to a rib injury in the third quarter.  After the game, Raiders' head coach Jon Gruden said that Renfrow broke a rib and punctured a lung which could force him to miss the rest of the season. Renfrow returned from injury in Week 16 against the Los Angeles Chargers.  During the game, Renfrow caught seven passes for 107 yards and a touchdown during the 24–17 win. In the following week's game against the Denver Broncos, Renfrow caught six passes for 102 yards and a touchdown during the 16-15 loss. Overall, Renfrow finished the 2019 season with 49 receptions for 605 receiving yards and four receiving touchdowns.

2020

Renfrow was fined  by the NFL on October 5, 2020, for attending a maskless charity event hosted by teammate Darren Waller during the COVID-19 pandemic in violation of the NFL's COVID-19 protocols for the 2020 season. In 2020, Renfrow played in 16 games, started 6, and caught 56 passes for 656 yards, as well as scoring two touchdowns.

2021

In Week 12, Renfrow had 8 receptions for 134 yards in a 36–33 win over the Dallas Cowboys. In Week 13, Renfrow had 9 receptions for 102 yards in a 17–15 loss against the Washington Football Team. In Week 14, Renfrow had 13 receptions for 117 yards and a 4-yard touchdown pass from Derek Carr in a 9–48 loss to the Kansas City Chiefs. Overall, Renfrow finished the 2021 regular season setting a career high in receptions (103), receiving yards (1,038) and receiving touchdowns (9).

Renfrow made his playoff debut in the Wild Card Round against the Cincinnati Bengals, catching 8 passes for 58 yards in the 26–19 loss.

2022

On June 10, 2022, Renfrow signed a two-year, $32 million contract extension with the Las Vegas Raiders. In Week 2 against the Arizona Cardinals, Renfrow had seven catches for 59 yards, but fumbled twice with one recovered and returned for a touchdown by Byron Murphy in overtime in the 23-29 loss. Renfrow also suffered a concussion after being hit by Isaiah Simmons during the play that caused the fumble. He was placed on injured reserve on November 10, 2022 and reactivated on December 17, 2022.

NFL career statistics

Regular season

Postseason

Personal life
Renfrow is one of six children. His mother, Suzanne, and brother, Jordan, both graduated from Clemson. Renfrow's father, Tim Renfrow, is one of eleven children.

Renfrow married his high school sweetheart, Camilla, on April 13, 2019, in DeBordieu, South Carolina. They have one daughter together.

Renfrow is a Christian. Renfrow has said “We’re trying to win every game but at the end of the day, that’s ultimately what matters, what your relationship is with Christ. Whenever football is long and gone and 100 years from now, [God will] still be there and that’s kind of driven me.”

References

External links

Clemson Tigers bio
Las Vegas Raiders bio

1995 births
Living people
American Conference Pro Bowl players
American football wide receivers
Clemson Tigers football players
Las Vegas Raiders players
Oakland Raiders players
People from Myrtle Beach, South Carolina
Players of American football from South Carolina